Isaac Cordal (born 1974) is a Spanish Galician artist whose work involves sculpture and photography in the urban environment. He lives in Brussels and in Galicia.

Early life
Cordal was born in 1974 in Pontevedra, Galicia, Spain. He studied at the University of Fine Arts Pontevedra, degree in sculpture. He studied for five years at the School of Canteiros Pontevedra, a school dedicated to the conservation of stone crafts. He also trained at Camberwell College of Arts in London. Isaac Cordal was a founding member of Alg-a.org, digital art community from Galicia. He was part of the artistic collective Ludd34560 and Sr. Pause. He was an active member of the death metal scene in Spain, publishing the fanzine Exorcism and playing guitar in the band Dismal (1992–1998).

Artistic career
Cement Eclipses is one of his best known projects consisting of small cement sculptures photographed in urban space. His figures can be found pasted on top of bus shelters, walls, cornices ... by its small size (approximately 15 cm) is
necessary to pay much attention to find them. The sculptures serve for the artist as a metaphor to reflect on politics, bureaucracy, power ... They are presented in various absurd situations in urban
space. His work can be seen both in galleries and urban space. Small nomadic sculptures have been seen in cities like Brussels, London, Berlin, Zagreb, Łódź, Nantes, San Jose, Barcelona, Vienna, Malmo, Paris, Milan, Bogotá. His work is a critical reflection on the idea of progress, of human misery, climate change and the gradual devaluation of our existence among others topics. Small sculptures represent primarily a social stereotype apparently next to businessman dressed in bright pink lama onzie and wolf slippers, briefcases, timeless beings, as the gray men of Momo by Michael Ende.

Cement Eclipses Project

Le Voyage à Nantes - Follow the leaders
This was a massive installation presented in 2013 during the summer cultural event Le voyage à Nantes,
located in Plaza du Boffay, one of the most central squares of Nantes. The measurement of the installation
was of approximately 20 m x 20 m and it was composed by some 2000 figures and buildings of
cement on scale semi destroyed representing a city in ruins.

In a 2012 interview with Agenda Magazine, Cordal explained:

Our gaze is so strongly focused on beautiful, large things, whereas the city also contains zones that have the potential to be beautiful, or that were really beautiful in the past, which we overlook. I find it really interesting to go looking for those very places and via small-scale interventions to develop a different way of looking at our behaviour as a social mass.

Waiting for climate change
In various projects Cordal has shown interest in topics related to climate change. During the
triennal Beaufort04, he presented a series of sculptures of individuals on the top of poles wearing lifebuoys and 'waiting' for the climate change. An ironic proposal to reflect on our ineffectiveness with the degradation of the planet. During Le Voyage à Nantes, in the summer of 2013, he presented an installation of floating life-size sculptures in the moat of the castle of the Dukes of Brittany, with businessmen represented cast adrift.

Politicians discussing global warming
This image is a reproduction of the sculpture installation The Electoral Campaign performed by Cordal in Berlin in 2011. It became popular on the Internet under the title Politicians Discussing Global Warming, although it was actually part of his series called Follow the Leaders.

Cement bleak project
Sculptures are made with metal grille with the intention of projecting shadows. One of his best-known projects is Cement Bleak, an urban installation held in London in 2009 with strainers modelled in the shapes of faces which became visible with public lightning at night when projecting their shadows on the paving.

Bibliography

Personal bibliography
Small interventions in the big cities. Carpet Bombing Culture (UK). 2011
Cement Eclipses. Le voyage à Nantes. Memo, France. 2013.

Collective bibliography
Microworlds. By Margherita Dessanay and Marc Valli
Untitled. III: This Is Street Art. Gary Shove. 2011
The Triennial of Contemporary Art by the Sea Beaufort. 2012
Street Art. Mode d´emploi. Jerome Catz. Flammarion. 2013
New Street Art. Claude Crommelin. 2013
Concrete Canvas: How Street Art is Changing the Way Our Cities Look. 2014

References

External links
  
Isaac Cordal in Art Days
Theguardian.com
Ignant.de
Electricliterature.com
alg-a.org

1974 births
Living people
Sculptors from Galicia (Spain)
20th-century Spanish sculptors
20th-century Spanish male artists
Spanish male sculptors
21st-century Spanish sculptors
Spanish photographers
People from Pontevedra
21st-century Spanish male artists